Lapalala Wilderness is a 48,000 hectare Big 5 conservation area situated within the UNESCO. declared Waterberg Biosphere, Limpopo Province, South Africa.

Lapalala is regarded as an exceptional conservation legacy. Managed by the non-profit Lapalala Wilderness Foundation, it was one of the first private protected areas in South Africa to reintroduce black rhinoceros in 1981.

The reserve is a protected area under the National Environmental Management Protected Areas Act of 57 of 2003 (Protected Areas Act).

The reserve hosts the widely acclaimed Lapalala Wilderness School, which has provided environmental education to over 150,000 children – mostly from regional communities – since its inception in 1985.

Lapalala engages with neighbouring communities on a variety of community upliftment projects and job creation initiatives.

The mandate of the Lapalala Wilderness Foundation focuses on the biodiversity management and research within Lapalala Wilderness.

The Palala and Blocklands rivers flow through Lapalala for over 60km and are identified as National Freshwater Ecosystem Priority Areas. The landscape forms part of the Central Bushveld Biome.

Eight different types of land have been identified in the reserve, which is an indicator of heterogeneity, and thus the diversity of Lapalala habitats. The diversity of habitats and long-term conservation is attractive to a large number of birds and wildlife.

There are currently two wildlife tourism sites within Lapalala, Tintswalo at Lapalala and Noka Lodge.

See also
https://www.lapalala.com
https://www.lwschool.org/
Prehistoric rock paintings
Blue Wildebeest

References

External links
Lapalala Wilderness Summary Information

Palala River
Geography of South Africa
Nature conservation in South Africa